Obi is a novel written by Nigerian novelist John Munonye. The first edition was published in 1969. It is forty-fifth instalment of the Heinemann African Writers Series.

References 

1969 Nigerian novels